Operation Display Deterrence was a 65-day NATO operation to protect the Turkish border region with Iraq, made in response to an Article 4 declaration by the Turkish government in response to the Iraq War.

Objectives and operational activity
It was aimed at defending Turkey from a threat from Iraq and deterring aggression.  NATO's military deployment consisted of AWACS surveillance aircraft and crews, TMD units, and biological and chemical defence equipment.  Command was set up in Eskişehir.  NATO assets were sent to the Konya air base in Turkey, along with Patriot missile systems installed in Diyarbakir and Batman to help guard their airspace during military operations of the Iraq War.

Operation Active Fence
Similar assets, deployment, and lessons from this operation were carried forward to Operation Active Fence in 2012.

References

Military operations involving NATO